Duke Huai of Qin (died 425 BC) was from 428 to 425 BC the 24th ruler of the Zhou Dynasty Chinese state of Qin that eventually united China to become the Qin Dynasty.  His ancestral name was Ying (嬴), and Duke Huai was his posthumous title.

Duke Huai was the younger son of Duke Ligong of Qin, who died in 443 BC and was succeeded by Duke Zao of Qin, Duke Huai's older brother.  When Duke Zao died in 429 BC, Duke Huai was exiled in the State of Jin.  He returned to Qin and took the throne.

In 425 BC, the fourth year of Duke Huai's reign, Qin general Chao (鼌) and other ministers rebelled against Duke Huai.  Duke Huai was besieged and committed suicide.  As his son Crown Prince Zhaozi (昭子) died early, the ministers installed Zhaozi's son Duke Ling of Qin on the throne.  Duke Huai also had a younger son, later known as Duke Jian of Qin, who would succeed Duke Ling as the 26th ruler of Qin.

References

Year of birth unknown
Rulers of Qin
5th-century BC Chinese monarchs
425 BC deaths
Suicides in China
Ancient people who committed suicide